The 1962 Australian Touring Car Championship was a CAMS sanctioned Australian motor racing title for Appendix J Touring Cars. It was contested as a single race, staged at the Longford Circuit, in Tasmania, Australia, on 3 March 1962. The title, which was the third Australian Touring Car Championship, was won by Bob Jane, driving a Jaguar Mark 2 3.8.

Classes
Cars competed in six engine capacity classes:
 Under 1000cc
 1000–1600cc
 1600–2000cc
 2000–2600cc
 2600–3500cc
 Over 3500cc

There were no entries in the 1600–2000cc class.

Race
Jaguars continued their domination of the championship in 1962. Four were entered for the event, though Ian Geoghegan was forced to withdraw his after breaking a rear axle during practice. This left the Jaguars of Bob Jane, defending champion Bill Pitt and Bill Burns to take the front row of the grid. Norm Beechey had entered a Chevrolet Impala but was unable to attend Longford.

Jane led away from the start with Pitt in pursuit. However, Pitt suffered an overdrive problem during the race which allowed Jane to take an easy win, while Burns completed the podium. West was running in fourth during the final lap, but a burned piston meant he had to limp to the finish. He was passed by Brigden, who then went straight ahead at the final corner with fading brakes. West retook fourth heading onto pit straight but Brigden was able to turn around and repass West in the final 400 metres. Ross Farmer finished sixth ahead of Bob Holden, Peter Manton, who had made contact with a lapped car and pitted to check for damage, and George Maguire, the last finisher.

The domination of the Jaguars was proven in the speeds taken from the flying-eighth: Jane was recorded at 134 mph while West and Brigden only managed 117 and 106 mph respectively.

Results
Class winners are indicated by bold text.

Statistics
 Pole position: Bob Jane
 Fastest lap: Bob Jane, 3:07.1
 Race distance: 15 laps, 108.60 km
 Average speed: 136.31 km/h

References

External links
 Image of the start of the 1962 Australian Touring Car Championship at jagqld.org.au via web.archive.org. Left to right on the front row are the Jaguars of Bob Jane, Bill Pitt and Bill Burns.

Australian Touring Car Championship seasons
Touring Car Championship
Motorsport in Tasmania